Loretta "Loz" Harrop (born July 17, 1975, in Brisbane, Queensland) is an Australian triathlete.

As a teenager she attended Cavendish Road State High School along with her siblings and as of 2007 has a house named after her. Harrop house which will go by the colour red.

Harrop competed at the first Olympic triathlon at the 2000 Summer Olympics. She placed fifth with a total time of 2:01:42.82.  Her split times were 19:37.98 for the swim, 1:05:40.70 for the cycling, and 0:36:24.14 for the run.

Four years later, Harrop competed in the 2004 Summer Olympics in Athens. She was even more successful this time, winning a silver medal with the time of 2:04:50.17. The splits for that run were 18:37.00 for the swim, 1:09:05.00 for the cycling, and 37:08.00 for the run.

Harrop is married to Brad Jones who was a talented Australian rules player in the AFLQ (Queensland) competition.

References 

1975 births
Living people
Australian female triathletes
Olympic triathletes of Australia
Olympic medalists in triathlon
Medalists at the 2004 Summer Olympics
Triathletes at the 2000 Summer Olympics
Triathletes at the 2004 Summer Olympics
Sportswomen from Queensland
Sportspeople from Brisbane
Olympic silver medalists for Australia
21st-century Australian women